Chrysoritis hyperion is a species of butterfly in the family Lycaenidae. It is endemic to South Africa. It is mostly treated as a subspecies of Chrysoritis swanepoeli.

Sources
 

Chrysoritis
Butterflies described in 1975
Endemic butterflies of South Africa
Taxonomy articles created by Polbot
Taxobox binomials not recognized by IUCN